The Austrian Cup is an annual cup competition for Austrian basketball teams. The competition was introduced in 1994, the Final Four in 1995. Since 1997, a Final Four MVP Award is handed out to the best player in the final phase. Swans Gmunden is the record cup winner with six victories.

Finals

Titles by team
Teams in italics are no longer active.

Notes

References

General

Specific

External links
Austrian Cup at Flashscores

Cup
Basketball cup competitions in Europe